Horn Culture is an album by jazz saxophonist Sonny Rollins, his second to be released on the Milestone label, featuring performances by Rollins with Walter Davis Jr., Yoshiaki Masuo, Bob Cranshaw, David Lee and Mtume.

Reception

The AllMusic review by Scott Yanow states: "a decent effort... Nothing too essential occurs but the music is generally enjoyable".

Track listing
All compositions by Sonny Rollins except as indicated
 "Pictures in the Reflection of a Golden Horn" – 4:47
 "Sais" (Mtume) – 11:47
 "Notes for Eddie" – 7:49
 "God Bless the Child" (Arthur Herzog Jr., Billie Holiday) – 5:37
 "Love Man" – 9:22
 "Good Morning Heartache" (Ervin Drake, Dan Fisher, Irene Higginbotham) – 8:18
Recorded in NYC & Berkeley, CA, April–July, 1973

Personnel
Sonny Rollins – tenor saxophone (all tracks), soprano saxophone (track 2)
Walter Davis Jr. – piano (tracks 1, 3–6), electric piano (track 2)
Yoshiaki Masuo – guitar
Bob Cranshaw – electric bass
David Lee – drums
Mtume – percussion (tracks 1, 3–5), piano (track 2)

References

1973 albums
Milestone Records albums
Sonny Rollins albums
Albums produced by Orrin Keepnews